The 1987–88 Bradley Braves men's basketball team represented Bradley University during the 1987–88 NCAA Division I men's basketball season. The Braves were members of the Missouri Valley Conference (MVC) and played their home games at Carver Arena. They won the MVC regular season championship as well as the conference tournament. Bradley finished the season 26–5, and qualified for the NCAA tournament.  They were led by second-year head coach, and MVC Coach of the Year, Stan Albeck, and Consensus First-team All-American Hersey Hawkins, who led the nation in scoring by averaging 36.3 points per game. Hawkins collected multiple national player of the year awards, and remains the career scoring leader in Missouri Valley Conference history.

Roster

Schedule

|-
!colspan=12 style=| Regular season

|-
!colspan=9 style=|MVC tournament

|-
!colspan=9 style= | NCAA tournament

Rankings

Awards and honors
Hersey Hawkins – Adolph Rupp Trophy, AP Player of the Year, Oscar Robertson Trophy, Sporting News Player of the Year, UPI Player of the Year, Consensus First-team All-American, MVC Player of the Year
Stan Albeck – MVC Coach of the Year

Team players in the 1988 NBA Draft

References

Bradley Braves men's basketball seasons
Bradley
Bradley
Bradley Braves men's basketball
Bradley Braves men's basketball